Rohan may refer to:

Places
 Rohan, Morbihan, a French commune in Brittany
 Château des Rohan (Mutzig), France
 Żebbuġ, Malta, also known as Città Rohan
 De Rohan Arch, a commemorative arch in Żebbuġ
 Palais Rohan, Bordeaux, France
 Palais Rohan, Strasbourg, France
 Rohan Castle in Saverne, France
 Fort Rohan, a fort in Malta
 Rohan, Kharkiv Oblast, an urban-type settlement in Kharkiv Oblast

People
 Rohan (name), index of people with the name
 The House of Rohan, a family of French nobility from Morbihan
 Duke of Rohan

In fiction
 Rohan (Middle-earth), a realm in J. R. R. Tolkien's Middle-earth
 Prince Rohan, the hero of Melanie Rawn's Dragon Prince trilogy
 Rohan, a character in the television series The Legend of Korra
 Rohan, a character in the television series The Mystic Knights of Tir Na Nog
 Rohan, a character in the novel The Invincible
 Rohan Kishibe, a character in the manga Diamond is Unbreakable and main character of its spin-off oneshot manga series, Thus Spoke Kishibe Rohan

Other uses
 Rohan (clothing), a clothing company
 Rohan: Blood Feud, an online computer game
 Rohan Hours

See also
 Roan (disambiguation)
 Roanne